The Biggin Hall Hotel is a Grade II listed public house at 214 Binley Road, Coventry, CV3 1HG.

It was built in 1921–1923 for Marston, Thompson & Evershed, and the architect was T. F. Tickner.

It was Grade II listed in 2015 by Historic England.

References

Pubs in the West Midlands (county)
Grade II listed pubs in the West Midlands (county)
Buildings and structures in Coventry